Kala Keerthi Suminda Sirisena (Sinhala: සුමින්ද සිරිසේන) (born July 4, 1948) is an actor in Sri Lankan cinema, theater and television. He has played a wide range of starring or supporting roles and a recipient of Best Actor award in many award festivals.

Personal life
Sirisena was born on July 4, 1948, in Bossella, a rural village in Kegalle, Sri Lanka as the eldest of the family. His father Bulathgamuwa Sirisena was a small-time businessman in the village who also performed traditional Sri Lankan folk dramas and his mother Punchi Nona was a housewife. After having his primary education at the village school Pussellawa Maha Vidyalaya, he was awarded a scholarship to attend Tholangamuwa Central College in 1963. He has two younger brothers and two sisters.

After his school education, Sirisena moved to Colombo to join the Sri Lanka Railways as a Special Apprentice in 1969. While establishing his career as an actor in theater, Sirisena went to Oman in 1970 to work as a quantity surveyor for two years. After returning home, he worked as a technical officer at the Victoria Dam project. Then he went back abroad in 1979 and returned to Sri Lanka in 1984.

Before 1971, he was an activist and continuously attended to the meetings conducted by Janatha Vimukthi Peramuna. But as the party entered the process of armed struggle, he quit from politics. He has obtained B.A degree of Social Sciences from Open University of Sri Lanka and then completed M.A degree from University of Sri Jayewardenepura.

He is married to Leela Sirisena. The couple have two sons, Prabhath and Nanditha.

Illness
In May 2012, Sirisena was admitted to the Intensive Care Unit of Colombo National Hospital due to sudden illness and fever. Since then, he has had difficulties with walking. He is currently taking physiotherapy treatments.

Since 2012 Sirisena has not taken part in any productions due to illness.

Acting career
At Tholangamuwa, he studied under Ariyawansa Ranaweera, Jayasumana Dissanayake, Daya Alwis and Wijayaratne Athurupane who were scholars and artists that had a major influence on Sri Lankan theater and arts for many decades. In 1967 Sirisena played the lead role in the stage drama Girikutha which was selected to the final round of State School Drama Festival. In 1969, he joined the first batch of students of the theater school Ranga Shilpa Shalika at Lionel Wendt Art Centre founded by Dhamma Jagoda with the help of Daya Alwis. His first role on the public stage was the role of "Dionis" in the play Moodu Puththu, which also marked the first appearance of popular cinema actor Ravindra Randeniya. He acted in many stage dramas of the 1970s.  

After returning to Sri Lanka in 1984, Sirisena was involved in Thilak Gunawardena's dramas. He acted in the plays Sapatheru Hamine by Miyuri Samarasinghe and then in Meepura Wasiyo by Somaratne Dissanayake. After completing the studies, he joined the drama group of Ediriweera Sarachchandra and acted in renowned stage dramas such as Maname, Sinhabahu, Bavakadaturawa, Mahasara and Kada walalu. In 1993, Sirisena won the Best Actor award for the role in Kadathurawa at State Drama Festival. In 2002, he formed a drama school called "Siwuranga". He was able to produce four batches of students from that academy. Thereafter he worked as an instructor at the Tower Hall Academy in Colombo.

Sirisena's first teledrama was Sihina Nimnaya, produced by Sri Lanka Rupavahini in 1985. He gained wide acclaim for his second teledrama Kumarihami, another Rupavahini production, where he played the supporting role of Hicchi Mahattaya. Since then he has acted in more than 40 teleseries. His role as "Isaa" in critically acclaimed serial Charitha Thunak is a hallmark of his television career. His maiden cinema acting came through the role of "Upali" in the 1976 film Dhululu Malak. He has also acted on many critically notable films such as Saptha Kanya, Yakada Pihatu, Uppalawanna, Samanala Thatu and Ira Handa Yata.

During his illness, he was working with two television serials - Sepalika and Boralu Paara.

Notable stage dramas 

 Aadi Rele Nadagama
 Ananda Javanika
 Andarela
 Andhakaraya
 Bavakadaturawa
 Girikutha
 Hasthiraja Mahathmaya
 Hiru Nethi Lowa
 Kadathurawa
 Kada Walalu
 Konthanona Samugenima
 Mahasara
 Maname
 Meepura Wasiyo
 Megha
 Moodu Puththu
 Muhunu Dekak
 Nadagamkarayo
 Sapatheru Hamine
 Sinhabahu
 Thaksala Nadagama
 Umathu San Warusawa
 Vinishchaya
 Wansakkarayo
 Wes Muhunu

Selected television serials 

 Abuddassa Kalaya
 Angani 
 Asani Wasi
 Bogala Sawundiris 
 Boralu Para.
 Chandra Vinsathi 
 Charitha Thunak
 Dambulugala Sakmana 
 Dangakara Tharu
 Dumriya Andaraya, 
 Ekamath Eka Rataka  
 Ekata Gatuma  
 Hathara Wate
 Jeewithaya Dakinna 
 Mage Kaviya Mata Denna 
 Mehew Rate, 
 Mindada
 Monarathenna 
 Nadeeladiya 
 Nisala Vila
 Paramitha, 
 Pathok Palama
 Pipi Pium, 
 Punaragamanaya 
 Ramya Suramya
 Sepalika
 Sanda Amawakai
 Sanda Dev Diyani 
 Sanda Nethi Lova
 Satya 
 Sudu Mal Kanda
 Theth Saha Viyali 
 Uththamavi
 Vinivindimi
 Weten Eha, 
 Yasa Isuru,

Filmography
 No. denotes the Number of Sri Lankan film in the Sri Lankan cinema.

Awards and honors
 Suminda Sirisena was awarded Kala Keerthi, the highest national honour for arts, culture and drama in Sri Lanka, in 2017.

 In 2014 he was awarded the Deshanethru award and the Kala Bhushana state award in recognition of the service he had rendered to the country's performing arts.

State Drama Festival, Sri Lanka

|-
| 1992
| Megha 
| Best Supporting Actor
| 
|-
| 1993
| Bavakadathurawa 
| Best Actor
| 
|-
| 1995
| Andarela 
| Best Supporting Actor
| 
|-
| 1997
| Romaya Gini Gani 
| Best Actor
| 
|}

State Tele Awards Festival, Sri Lanka

|-
| 2007
| Punaragamanaya 
| Best Supporting Actor
| 
|-
| 2013
| Monara Tenna 
| Best Supporting Actor
| 
|}

Sumathi Tele Awards, Sri Lanka

|-
| 1997
| Megha 
| Best Supporting Actor
| 
|-
| 1999
| Nisala Wila 
| Best Actor
| 
|-
| 2003
| Ransirige Sangramaya 
| Best Supporting Actor
| 
|-
| 2004
| Ramya Suramya 
| Best Supporting Actor
| 
|}

Signis Awards, Sri Lanka

|-
| 1995
| Siyapatha 
| Best Actor
| 
|-
| 1995
| Isiwara Asapuwa 
| Best Supporting Actor
| 
|-
| 2002
| Asani Wesi 
| Best Actor
| 
|-
| 2004
| Hadavila Sakmana 
| Best Actor
| 
|-
| 2005
| Uttamaviya 
| Best Actor
| 
|-
| 2005
| Ginikirillee 
| Outstanding Performance
| 
|-
| 2006
| Teth Saha Viyali 
| Best Actor
| 
|-
| 2011
| Abarthu Atha 
| Best Supporting Actor
| 
|}

Raigam Awards, Sri Lanka

|-
| 2003
| Punchirala  
| Best Actor
| 
|-
| 2018
| Excellence of Drama 
| Special Merit Award
| 
|}

References

1948 births
Sri Lankan dramatists and playwrights
Sri Lankan male stage actors
Sinhalese male actors
Sri Lankan male television actors
Sri Lankan male film actors
20th-century dramatists and playwrights
20th-century Sri Lankan male actors
Alumni of the University of Sri Jayewardenepura
Living people
Kala Keerthi